Oxathres maculosa is a species of beetle in the family Cerambycidae. It was described by Monné and Tavakilian in 2011.

References

Acanthocinini
Beetles described in 2011